Karakore (sometimes spelled as two words, Kara Kore) is a town in north-eastern Ethiopia.

Demographics 
Based on figures from the Central Statistical Agency in 2005, Karakore has an estimated total population of 7,487 of whom 3,795 were males and 3,692 were 
females. The 1994 census reported this town had a total population of 4,311 of whom 1,997 were males and 2,314 were females. It is one of three towns in Efratana Gidim woreda.

Notes 

Populated places in the Amhara Region